Marion Gray Traver (born 1892 - died 1979) was an American woman painter remembered in part for her membership and volunteerism with the (originally named) National Association of Women Painters and Sculptors (herein "the Association") during the first half of the 20th Century.  In April 1941, the National Association of Women Painters and Sculptors voted to change the name of the organization to the National Association of Women Artists and at that formative meeting, Traver was elected Recording Secretary, one of six officers. 

For 11 annual exhibitions of the Association, from 1930 through 1940 inclusively, Traver's paintings won the National Association Prize a total of 5 times.  Importantly, First Lady Eleanor Roosevelt awarded the 1939 annual prize to Traver for the most popular work of art (out of 300 artist entries) at a special Fiftieth Anniversary Exhibition of the Association on September 28,1939.

Exhibitions and press comments 
In February 1921, the first notable New York showing of her work was titled “Monotypes in Color” from February 6th to 25th, 1921 at the Schwartz Galleries, then located at 14 East Forty-sixth Street.  The New York Times review commented:  “She favors increasingly winter subjects and her management of snow effects is remarkably good and well within the capabilities of the enticing medium".  This early review concerning snow landscapes was very telling of her emerging career because many of her later oil paintings included snow.   

In January 1928, Traver exhibited both monotypes and oil paintings at the original Art Centre in New York City at 65 East Fifty-sixth Street.  The New York Times commented on this exhibition two times.  The initial New York Times review titled “Winter Paintings Shown” of January 17, 1928 noted “Most of the pictures are Winter scenes of Massachusetts and Vermont and depict the play of sunshine on snow.”  The second New York Times review, printed five days later on January 22, 1928 within “To Be Seen, Work of Variety and Interest in the Galleries” reviewed her work with:  “Marion Gray Traver, now exhibiting oils and monotypes at the Art Centre, is evidently an artist who prefers painting immediate outdoor impressions to the studio approach landscape.  With the free use of the palate knife, Traver has succeeded in transmitting her impressions to canvas with great freedom and range of color.  Minute variations in tonal gray are skillfully welded in “One Winter’s Day,” while other canvases are built on the delicate tints of Spring or on the rich harmonies of full Summer.”  Traver's father and teacher, artist George A. Traver, died “at his residence” shortly after this exhibition on or about March 4th, 1928. 

On April 20, 1930,Traver was covered by New York Times art reporter Ruth Green Harris in her column “A REVIEWER’S NOTEBOOK”, “Jean Dufy, Gallibert, Ben Shawn, Whorf, Nagel, Captain Vivian Guy, Other Artists”.  Miss Harris reviewed Traver’s then exhibition at the Art Centre with: “According to your nature, you like better or not so well the less recondite poetry of Marion Gray Traver’s painting.  Painting it most certainly is, in oil and color and a large form brush.  In well woven composition she describes the pleasantest of familiar things:  Moonlight on snow, an orchard in Winter, a road to the village and Main Street in New England.” 

In 1938, at the Forty-seventh Annual Exhibition of the National Association of Women Painters and Sculptors, Traver won the National Association Prize (her 3rd) for a winter landscape titled “Silent Sunlit Morning, Vermont”.  Earlier the same painting had won the Celine Baekeland Prize of $150. 

On September 28, 1939, First Lady Eleanor Roosevelt awarded the 1939 annual National Association prize to Traver (her 4th) for the most popular work of art - an oil painting of a winter landscape titled “Among the Pines” - at a special Fiftieth Anniversary Exhibition of the Association on September 28,1939.  More than 300 items from women artists were on exhibition.  

From December 1940 through January 1941, Traver won - for the fifth time - the National Association Prize at the Annual Exhibition of the National Association of Women Painters and Sculptors exhibit at the American Fine Arts Galleries by popular vote.  Her winning painting was titled “Just at Twilight”.

References 

20th century in art
20th-century women artists
Lists of artists
Lists of women artists
National Association of Women Artists members
20th-century American women artists
Eleanor Roosevelt